Department III of the Ministry of Internal Affairs, also known as the  State Security Department of the Ministry of Interior, was the secret police of the Hungarian People's Republic after the State Protection Authority (AVH) was disbanded in 1956. The MIA III was called the AVH as a derogatory name due to the former replacing the latter in the Hungarian Revolution of 1956.

Archived data related to the AVH and MIA III are made available through the Historical Archives of the Hungarian State Security.

History
The Ministry of Interior created Department II in order to replace the State Protection Authority in 1956 as the Political Investigation Department, which operated from 1956 to 1962. The department was further reorganized under András Tömpe because of a scandal that involved a Hungarian military officer named Béla Lapusnyik, who sought asylum to the West through Austria in May 1962. From 1962 to 1964, the state security structure was reorganized with the renaming of the department as MIA III.

According to a statement made by János Kenedi on January 1, 1971, the department had 3,975 staff members, with 242 members serving in the III/III Department. The statement also mentioned that around 11,000 to 17,000 MIA III officers were also working in the department.

In 1978, Section 261 of the Hungarian Criminal Code came into effect, providing legal measures against terrorism. In 1979, the department was instructed by the Hungarian Interior Ministry to work with the Rendőrség as terrorism was made a state security task. Department III/II-8 was tasked to take command of sections involved in fighting against terrorism, including Departments III/I, III/II, III/III and III/IV.

In the early 1980s reorganization of the entire state security apparatus took place as a response to the increasing number of tasks. Department III/I-8 was divided into Department III/II-9 and Department III/II-10. Department III/II-9 was tasked with warrants. Department III/II-10, which was formed from the former sub-departments III/II-8-B and C, was tasked with controlling tourism and terrorism, with counterterrorism being specifically the task of sub-department III/II-10-A. Department III/II-10 also worked with the Action Subsection of the Rendőrség to conduct periodic raids against Turkish and Arabic individuals suspected of terrorism, arresting, expelling, and initiating criminal procedures against them with the aim of forcing them from the country. By 1987, Ministry of the Interior agencies had compiled files on the Organization of International Revolutionaries (OIR), Abu Nidal Organization, Grey Wolves, and Muslim Brotherhood.

Hungarian authorities had mixed relations with terrorist groups in the 1980s. Various international terrorists found temporary refuge or attempted to establish bases of operation in Hungary in the 1970s and 80s, such as Basque, Turkish, Kurdish, Irish, and other groups, though they were surveilled. Some organizations were provided state support, such T-34 tanks and training given to the Palestinian Liberation Front in 1979, though its leader Muhammad Zaidan was forced out of Hungary after the Achille Lauro hijacking in 1985. Venezuelan terrorist Carlos the Jackal was allowed to operate from headquarters in Budapest during the early half of the 1980s, though state security closely surveilled him under confidential investigation C-79 and attempted to persuade him to leave. 

After Radio Free Europe/Radio Liberty's headquarters in Munich was bombed by Carlos on February 21, 1981, and with pressure from the United States, MIA III worked with Czechoslovak and East German intelligence to curb Carlos' activities throughout Eastern Europe and eventually drive him and his group out of Hungary in 1985. MIA III was also involved in removing ANO's Hungarian base in 1986, likely due to pressure from the US, in confidential investigation N-86. The change from state tolerance to intolerance of terrorists during the 1980s was due to politics. As Hungary opened foreign relations with non-communist countries, including Israel, and pressure from the Soviet Union decreased, the threat of terrorism against Hungarians grew, as did the counterterrorism department. In 1989, it collaborated fully with Japanese and South Korean agencies in an investigation of the Japanese Red Army.

In January 1990, the department was disbanded. The Military Intelligence Office and the Military Security Office were the first post-communist intelligence agencies to be created as the successor to MIA III.

Structure
MIA III was organized in the Hungarian Interior Ministry with the following structure:

 Department III/1 (Intelligence)
 III/I-1: Intelligence against the US and other international organizations
 III/I-2: Foreign Intelligence
 III/I-3: Intelligence against West Germany
 III/I-4: Intelligence against the Vatican, Israel and Church Emigration
 III/I-5: Scientific and Technical Intelligence
 III/I-6: Information, Evaluation and Analysis
 III/I-7: Intelligence against émigré groups
 III/I-8: Intelligence and employment of illegal residencies
 III/I-9: Documentation
 III/I-10: Personal affairs, training and methodology
 III/I-11: Intelligence against third-party countries
 III/I-12: Connections, Regitration, Finances and other related tasks
 III/I-13: National Encryption Center, including encryption/decryption operations
 III/I-X: Organization of operational connection
 III/I-Y: Security on foreign missions and residencies
 Dpeartment III/2 (Counter-Intelligence)
 III/II-1: Counter-Intelligence against the US and Latin America
 III/II-2: Counter-Intelligence against Austria and West Germany
 III/II-3: Counter-Intelligence against NATO and neutral countries
 III/II-4: Counter-Intelligence against Middle Eastern and Far East Asian countries
 III/II-5: Cross-border operational measures
 III/II-6: Protective measures for military industries, transport, communications, authorities and ministries
 III/II-7: Responses to areas under international cooperation
 III/II-8: Protective measures for field of tourism and for Hungarians returning with amnesty
 III/II-9: Analysis, evaluation and information
 III/II-10: International cooperation and responses in third country
 III/II-11: News communication, operational records and supplies
 Department III/3 (Internal Reaction & Sabotage)
 III/III-1: Operates usually together with Department III/I against churches/religious sects, including former priests/monks in émigré groups
 III/III-1-a: Internal Reaction against the Roman Catholic Church
 III/III-1-b: Internal Reaction against Roman Catholic Church leaders and institutes
 III/III-1-c: Internal Reaction against Protestant and other religious groups
 III/III-2: Preventive measures with young people in universities, colleges, youth clubs, galleries, etc.
 III/III-2-a: Preventive measures in higher education institutions
 III/III-2-b: Operations against anti-youth reaction forces
 III/III-3: Controlling activities against persons deemed dangerous 
 III/III-3-a: Inspection of F files, mostly on former political prisoners 
 III/III-3-b: Checks against flyers and graffiti
 III/III-4: Countermeasures against opposition groups 
 III/III-4-a: Proceedings against radical opponents
 III/III-4-b: Surveillance on Hungarian Socialist Workers' Party (HSWP) officials, Trotskyists and pseudo-leftists
 III/III-4-c: Countermeasurse against national opposition groups
 III/III-5: Protection of cultural property 
 III/III-5-a: Preventive measures against Hungarian Radio and Television, MTI, MUOSZ and the Writers' Association
 III/III-5-b: Preventive measures against groups associated with fine arts, music, museums, theaters, circuses, Hungarian Academy of Sciences, film, universities, colleges, homosexuals and demonstrations against the Bős-Nagymaros dam.
 III/III-6: Prevention operations of hostile propaganda material
 III/III-7: Reporting service, internal troubleshooting, data warehouse and record keeping
 III/III-8:
 III/III-A: Protection operations for HSWP officials 
 III/III-B: Independent analysis, evaluation and information
 Department III/4 (Military Response)
 III/IV-1: Responsive measures to Central Bodies and forces under General Staff of the Hungarian People's Army and to the Military Areas of the Ministries
 III/IV-2: Responsive measures to Areas of the Central Bodies of the Ministry of Defense, Armed Forces Headquarters, institutions and subordinate forces
 III/IV-3: Preventive measures in 5th Army
 III/IV-4: Preventive measures in air defense
 III/IV-5: Preventive measures in 3rd Corps
 III/IV-6: Preventive measures in Hinterland Headquarters
 III/IV-7: Preventive measures in Border Guard Area
 III/IV:
 Coordination subdivision on escaped soldiers and civilian staff, planning and implementation of central control
 Evaluation, Analysis, Data Processing and Propaganda Department
 Battlefield preparation subdivision - Intelligence in the expected areas of application of the Hungarian People's Army (Italy, Austria)
 Organizational, mobilization and news subdivision
 Department III/5 (Technical Operations)
 III/V-1: Class K Inspections
 III/V-2: Chemistry, printing technology and document production
 III/V-3: Maintenance and operation of operational and technical equipment
 III/V: Independent evaluation, monitoring, expert and economic subdivisions
 Department III/1 (Investigation Division)
 III/1-A: Counter-espionage 
 III/1-B: Internal Reaction preventive measures
 III/1-C: Military matters
 III/1-D: Evaluation, analysis and records
 III/1-E: Legal opinions and resolution
 III/1-F: Prison operations and networks
 III/1-G: Watchkeeping
 III/2: Operational Monitoring and Environmental Analysis Department
 III/3: Postal Items Intercepts
 III/4: Information, Evaluation and International Relations Department (Regular Intercepts)
 III/5: Radio Response Department
 III/6: Personnel Department

References

Bibliography

External links
 

Secret police
Collaborators with the Soviet Union
Defunct Hungarian intelligence agencies
Ministry of Interior III
Eastern Bloc